Chisom Obinna Onyeke (born 27 October 1988), known professionally as JaySynths, is a Nigerian record producer and sound engineer best known for producing Teni's hit single "Case" in 2018.

Early life and education
JaySynths was born and raised in Onitsha, Anambra State, Nigeria. He began his education at All Saints Primary School, Onitsha, before preceding to Government Secondary School, Karshi, Abuja. He graduated from University of Abuja with a degree in political science.

Music career
At the age of four, JaySynths started playing musical instruments such as Keyboard at his parent church. After his family moved to Abuja, he began his career in music production and was later appointed the music director of a choir. JaySynths has produced songs such as "Case" which won Best Pop Single at The Headies 2019, "Wait", "Fake Jersey", "Marry" and "Power Rangers" by Teni, "Daz How Star Do" by Skiibii. He has worked with Ice Prince, Victor AD, Mr Eazi, Broda Shaggi and Sarkodie.

Personal life
JaySynths is married to an ex-beauty queen, Christy Daniels whom he met during his undergraduate days in the university and they have one child together.

Awards

References 

Living people
1988 births
Nigerian record producers
University of Abuja alumni